Jabiluka is a pair of uranium deposits and mine development in the Northern Territory of Australia that was to have been built on land belonging to the Mirarr clan of Aboriginal people. The mine site is surrounded by, but not part of, the World Heritage–listed Kakadu National Park.

History

Exploration on the site began in the late 1960s with Jabiluka 1 being discovered in 1971 and the much larger Jabiluka 2 discovered in 1973. The Jabiluka deposits were included in the group of uranium deposits that were the subject of the Fox Enquiry. As a result of this enquiry, the Jabiluka mining lease and two others were created along with Kakadu National Park. Feasibility works into the development of the mine were well progressed at the time of the 1983 Australian federal election, which saw the Australian Labor Party take government. Under this government, an export licence for the uranium was unlikely to have been granted and the project development was stopped. Energy Resources of Australia Ltd bought the deposit from Pancontinental and proceeded without background work. Upon the election of the Howard Liberal Government in 1996, the project was once again placed into development.

Controversy

In 1998 the issue came to a head when Jacqui Katona and Yvonne Margarula, of the Mirarr people, called on activists to come from around Australia and the world to blockade the construction of the mine by Energy Resources of Australia (ERA). Over 500 people were arrested in the course of the eight-month blockade.

ERA developed the surface infrastructure and the decline down to the ore-body to allow for further definition of the resource. Falling uranium prices prevented the project from proceeding. ERA's parent company, North Ltd, was bought by Rio Tinto Group, who announced that the mine will not go ahead – at least until their nearby Ranger uranium mine is mined out.

The Mirarr people agitated for Rio Tinto to clean up the mine site and restore it in keeping with the surrounding National Park. On 12 August 2003 rehabilitation works commenced on the Jabiluka site, 50,000 tonnes of material from the mine were put back down the decline at Jabiluka, filling up 1.2 km of decline.

In 2013, work to remove and remediate the interim water management pond commenced.

According to ERA, between 2005 and 2015 over 16,000 stems of two dozen different species of native plants were planted at the Jabiluka site. Aerial photography shows significant recovery and regeneration.

Documentary films

The 1997 documentary film, Jabiluka, was produced and directed by David Bradbury. Another film on the subject was made by Cathy Henkel, called Walking Through a Minefield. It was released in 1999. In 2006, documentary filmmaker Pip Starr released Fight for Country: the story of the Jabiluka Blockade. Starr spent five years working on the film.

Future development

The Jabiluka Long-Term Care and Maintenance Agreement signed in February 2005 gives the traditional owners veto rights over future development of Jabiluka. However, in 2007, Rio Tinto suggested that the mine could reopen one day.

See also
 Uranium in the environment
 Anti-nuclear movement in Australia
 Activist Wisdom
 List of uranium mines
 Unconformity uranium deposits
 Uranium mining

References

Further reading
Paasonen, Karl-Erik (2007). Between Movements of Crisis and Movements of Affluence: An analysis of the campaign against the Jabiluka uranium mine, 1997–2000 PhD Thesis, School of Political Science and International Studies, University of Queensland.

External links

Geography of the Northern Territory
Uranium mines in Australia
Underground mines in Australia
Mines in the Northern Territory
Protests in Australia